Big Match is a 2014 South Korean action film written and directed by Choi Ho, starring Lee Jung-jae, Shin Ha-kyun, Lee Sung-min and BoA.

Plot
Choi Ik-ho (Lee Jung-jae), is a former footballer and UFC mixed martial arts star nicknamed "Zombie." When his older brother and coach Young-ho suddenly disappears, the police arrests him as the prime murder suspect. Then Ik-ho receives a phone call from Ace (Shin Ha-kyun), a genius mastermind who designs elaborate games for Korea's wealthiest citizens to bet astronomical sums of money on, conducted with real people in real-time using high-tech gadgets and CCTV cameras. To save his brother's life and his own, Ik-ho is forced to join Ace's game and follow instructions from a mysterious woman named Soo-kyung (BoA). Using his wits and skills against multiple adversaries, including cops and low-rent gangsters, Ik-ho completes seemingly impossible missions. Then he reaches the final round, during which he must find his brother in a huge soccer stadium, with a bomb strapped to his ankle and time ticking.

Cast
Lee Jung-jae as Choi Ik-ho
Shin Ha-kyun as Ace
Lee Sung-min as Choi Young-ho
BoA as Soo-kyung
Kim Eui-sung as Detective Do
Bae Sung-woo as Axe, gang member
Son Ho-jun as Jae-yeol, president of Ik-ho's fan club
Choi Woo-shik as Guru, hacker
Ryu Hye-rin as Twitter girl
Kim Yoon-seong as Department head Jo
Park Doo-shik as Detective Nam
Ra Mi-ran as Young-ho's wife

References

External links
 

South Korean action comedy films
Films directed by Choi Ho
South Korean thriller films
2010s South Korean films